The Kid from Broken Gun is a 1952 American western action film directed by Fred F. Sears, and starring Charles Starrett, Jock Mahoney, Angela Stevens, Tristram Coffin, and Myron Healey. The film was released by Columbia Pictures on August 16, 1952. This film became the 65th and final in the Durango Kid series.

Plot
After having threatened Matt Fallon, Jack Mahoney is on trial for Fallon's murder and the theft of a strong box. His friends Steve Reynolds and Smiley Burnette await the verdict. Mahoney's attorney, Gail Kingston, puts on a poor defense and Mahoney is jailed.

Doc Handy arrives with proof of ownership of the stolen box, but is killed before he can testify. Steve Reynolds (secretly The Durango Kid) tells of the discovery of hidden Santa Ana gold believed to be in the stolen strong box.

The Durango Kid gathers all interested parties in the courtroom and reveals the actual progression of events, thus exposing the real murderer.

Production and release
Since 1949 Columbia Pictures had been economizing on its series of Charles Starrett westerns. Every all-new production now alternated with a "cheater"—a lower-budget production that incorporated entire sequences from older Durango Kid features. In The Kid from Broken Gun, the new scenes take up only about half of the 55-minute running time. Scriptwriter Barry Shipman structured the film as a courtroom story, so the testimony from the witnesses could be related as flashbacks to the older scenes. The old footage is taken from The Fighting Frontiersman (1946) and West of Sonora (1948).

Charles Starrett retired after filming was completed, ending the longest string of starring films in motion-picture history. Starrett made 131 feature films between 1935 and 1952, exclusively for Columbia. The studio fell back on its usual practice whenever a series was discontinued: the character identification was dropped from the film credits and the promotional materials. Starrett received star billing, but The Durango Kid was no longer mentioned.

Cast
Charles Starrett as Steve Reynolds / The Durango Kid
Jock Mahoney as Jack Mahoney
Angela Stevens as Gail Kingston
Tristram Coffin as Martin Donohugh
Myron Healey as Kiefer
Helen Mowery as Dixie King (archive footage from The Fighting Frontiersman)
Smiley Burnette as Smiley Burnette
Chris Alcaide as Matt Fallon (uncredited)
Edgar Dearing as Judge Halloway (uncredited)
Mauritz Hugo as Sheriff (uncredited)
Emmett Lynn as Cimarron Dobbs (uncredited, archive footage from The Fighting Frontiersman and West of Sonora)
Ernie Adams as the Printer (uncredited, archive footage from The Fighting Frontiersman)
John Cason as Chuck (uncredited)
Donald Chaffin as Courtroom deputy (uncredited)
Bill Clark as Courtroom deputy (uncredited)
Robert Filmer as Munro (uncredited, archive footage from The Fighting Frontiersman)
Zon Murray as Henchman Slade (uncredited, archive footage from The Fighting Frontiersman)
George Chesebro as Henchman Rankin (uncredited, archive footage from The Fighting Frontiersman)
Charles Horvath as Henchman Al (uncredited)
Jim Diehl as Henchman (uncredited, archive footage from The Fighting Frontiersman)
Eddie Parker as Henchman (uncredited)
Bob Woodward as Henchman (uncredited)
Ted Mapes as Henchman (uncredited, archive footage from The Fighting Frontiersman)
Guy Edward Hearn as Jury foreman (uncredited)
Frank O'Connor as Juror (uncredited)
Steve Benton as Juror (uncredited)
Pat O'Malley as Doc Handy (uncredited)
Snub Pollard as Courtroom spectator (uncredited)
Buddy Roosevelt as Courtroom spectator (uncredited)
Cactus Mack as Courtroom spectator (uncredited)
Fred F. Sears as Narrator (voice only) (uncredited)
Bullet as Steve's horse (uncredited)
Raider as Durango's horse (uncredited)

References

External links

1952 Western (genre) films
1952 films
American Western (genre) films
Columbia Pictures films
American black-and-white films
Films directed by Fred F. Sears
1950s English-language films
1950s American films